Udea latipennalis is a moth in the family Crambidae. It was described by Aristide Caradja in 1928. It is found in Mongolia.

References

latipennalis
Moths described in 1928